is a Japanese former footballer.

Career
Having both played for and managed Yanmar Diesel, Onitake was one of the founding members of the club's J.League successor, Cerezo Osaka. He served as president of Cerezo Osaka from 1993 until 2004, when he was appointed vice-chairman of the J.League, a position he held until 2006, when he was made chairman.

Onitake is seen as a crucial figure in Cerezo Osaka history, helping them to promotion from the Japan Football League to the J.League.

He was inducted into the Japan Football Association hall of fame in 2015.

Managerial statistics

References

1939 births
Living people
Japanese footballers
Association football forwards
Cerezo Osaka players
Japan Soccer League players